Qiu Jin (8 November 1875 – 15 July 1907) was a Chinese revolutionary, feminist, and writer. Her courtesy names are Xuanqing and Jingxiong. Her sobriquet name is Jianhu Nüxia. Qiu was executed after a failed uprising against the Qing dynasty and is considered a national heroine in China and a martyr of republicanism and feminism.

Biography 

Born in Fujian, China, Qiu Jin spent her childhood in her ancestral home, Shaoxing, Zhejiang. Qiu was born into a wealthy family.  Her grandfather worked in the Xiamen city government and was responsible for the city's defense. Zhejiang province was famous for female education, and Qiu Jin had support from her family when she was young to pursue her educational interests. Her father, Qiu Shounan, was a government official and her mother came from a distinguished literati-official family. Qiu Jin's wealthy and educated background, along with her early exposure to political ideologies were key factors in her transformation to becoming a female pioneer for the woman's liberation movement and the republican revolution in China. 

In the early 1900s, Japan had started to experience western influences earlier than China. As to not fall behind, the Qing government sent many elites to learn from the Japanese. Qiu Jin was one of these elites that got the chance to study overseas. After studying in a women's school in Japan, Qiu returned to China to participate in a variety of revolutionary activities; and through her involvement with these activities, it became clear how Qiu wanted others to perceive her. Qiu called herself 'Female Knight-Errant of Jian Lake' — the role of the knight-errant, established in the Han dynasty, was a prototypically male figure known for swordsmanship, bravery, faithfulness, and self-sacrifice — and 'Vying for Heroism'.

Early life in China

Childhood activities 
Qiu Jin had her feet bound and began writing poetry at an early age. With the support from her family, Qiu Jin also learned how to ride a horse, use a sword, and drink wine—activities that usually only men were permitted to learn at the time.

Marriage 
In 1896 Qiu Jin got married. At the time she was only 21. Which was considered late for a woman of that time. Qiu Jin's father arranged her marriage to Wang Tingchun, the youngest son of a wealthy merchant in Hunan province. Qiu Jin did not get along well with her husband, as her husband only cared about enjoying himself. While in an unhappy marriage, Qiu came into contact with new ideas. The failure of her marriage affected her decisions later on, including choosing to study in Japan.

Aftermath of First Sino-Japanese War 
The Qing government lost the Sino-Japanese war from 1894-1895. Losing to Japan in this war woke the Qing government up to the fact that China was no longer the most powerful nation even in Asia. Japan had started learning western technology and accepting western standards earlier than China. This motivated the Qing government to progress and modernize. The Dowager Empress Cixi looked to Japan as a model to emulate, and her court organized tours to Japan. Many Chinese elites were sent to Japan to learn how they could build China like the Japanese were able to do. Qiu Jin was one of the girls who got the chance to study overseas as these opportunities were only given to the children of higher social class.

Life while studying in Japan 
In 1903, she decided to travel overseas and study in Tokyo, Japan, leaving her two children behind. She initially entered a Japanese language school in Surugadai, but later transferred to the Girls' Practical School in Kōjimachi, run by Shimoda Utako (later to become Jissen Women's University). The school prepared Qiu Jin with the skills she needed for revolutionary activities later on. With the education from Shimoda school, many female activists participated in the Republican Revolution in 1911. During her time in Tokyo, Qiu also helped to establish the Encompassing Love Society, a women’s group that promoted women’s education and protested the Russian presence in northeast China. She was very fond of martial arts, and she was known by her acquaintances for wearing Western male dress and for her nationalist, anti-Manchu ideology. She joined the anti-Qing society Guangfuhui, led by Cai Yuanpei, which in 1905 joined together with a variety of overseas Chinese revolutionary groups to form the Tongmenghui, led by Sun Yat-sen. Already known as a calligrapher and a poet, Qiu described herself as “tossing aside the brush to join the military ranks,” in encouraging educated women not to waste time on poetry but to instead engage in direct action. 

Within the Revolutionary Alliance, Qiu was responsible for the Zhejiang Province. Because the Chinese overseas students were divided between those who wanted an immediate return to China to join the ongoing revolution and those who wanted to stay in Japan to prepare for the future, a meeting of Zhejiang students was held to debate the issue. At the meeting, Qiu allied unquestioningly with the former group and thrust a dagger into the podium, declaring, "If I return to the motherland, surrender to the Manchu barbarians, and deceive the Han people, stab me with this dagger!" She subsequently returned to China in 1906 along with about 2,000 students.

While still in Tokyo, Qiu single-handedly edited a journal, Vernacular Journal (Baihua Bao). A number of issues were published using vernacular Chinese as a medium of revolutionary propaganda. In one issue, Qiu wrote A Respectful Proclamation to China's 200 Million Women Comrades, a manifesto within which she lamented the problems caused by bound feet and oppressive marriages. Having suffered from both ordeals herself, Qiu explained her experience in the manifesto and received an overwhelmingly sympathetic response from her readers. Also outlined in the manifesto was Qiu's belief that a better future for women lay under a Western-type government instead of the Qing government that was in power at the time. She joined forces with her cousin Xu Xilin and together they worked to unite many secret revolutionary societies to work together for the overthrow of the Qing dynasty. 

Between 1905 and 1907, Qiu Jin was also writing a novel called Stones of the Jingwei Bird in traditional ballad form, a type of literature often composed by women for women audiences. The novel describes the relationship between five wealthy women who decide to flee their families and the arranged marriages awaiting them in order to study and join revolutionary activities in Tokyo. Titles for the later uncompleted chapters suggest that the women will go on to talk about “education, manufacturing, military activities, speechmaking, and direct political action, eventually overthrowing the Qing dynasty and establishing a republic” — all of which were subject matters that Qiu either participated in or advocated for.

Life after returning to China 
Qiu Jin was known as an eloquent orator who spoke out for women's rights, such as the freedom to marry, freedom of education, and abolishment of the practice of foot binding. In 1906 she founded China Women's News (Zhongguo nü bao), a radical women's journal with another female poet, Xu Zihua in Shanghai. They published only two issues before it was closed by the authorities. In 1907, she became head of the Datong school in Shaoxing, ostensibly a school for sport teachers, but really intended for the military training of revolutionaries. While teaching in Datong school, she kept secret connection with local underground organization—The Restoration Society. This organization aimed to overthrow the Manchu government and restore Chinese rule.

Death 
In 1907, Xu Xilin, Qiu’s friend and the Datong school’s co-founder was executed for attempting to assassinate his Manchu superior. In the same year,  the authorities arrested Qiu at the school for girls where she was the principal. She was tortured as well but refused to admit her involvement in the plot. Instead the authorities used her own writings as incrimination against her and, a few days later, she was publicly beheaded in her home village, Shanyin, at the age of 31. Her last written words, her death poem, uses the literal meaning of her name, Autumn Gem, to lament of the failed revolution that she would never see take place:

  
(Autumn wind, autumn rain — they make one die of sorrow)During Qiu’s life, she also drew support from two close friends: Xu Zihua and Wu Zhiying — both of whom had sworn sisterhood with her. In the months following Qiu’s execution, Wu wrote three essays mourning Qiu — in which she criticized Qing officials for the execution and argued that Qiu Jin had been slandered and her actions “unjustly besmirched”. Soon after, the two sworn sisters set out to bury Qiu properly near West Lake, fulfilling Qiu’s wish to be buried near heroes of earlier periods. Qing officials soon ordered for her tomb to be razed, but Qiu Jin’s brother managed to retrieve her body in time. Ultimately, Wu Zhiying took possession of the memorial stele, installing it in her own house and selling stele rubbings as a way to commemorate her fallen friend. 

To this day, people continue to have varying opinions towards Qiu’s death. Many said that her death was unnecessary because she had enough time to escape before being caught by imperial soldiers. In fact, Qiu’s friends even warned her of incoming soldiers immediately after Xu Xilin’s death. Lu Xun, one of China’s greatest 20th-century writers was one of her biggest critics; he “[...] believed Qiu’s reckless behavior in Shaoxing was linked to the enormous adulation she received during her time in Japan.” She was “clapped to death,” he told a friend — although there is no clear explanation as to why Qiu decided to remain at the school despite knowing that the authorities were on their way.

Legacy 

Qiu was posthumously immortalized in the Republic of China's popular consciousness and literature. She is buried beside West Lake in Hangzhou. The People's Republic of China established a museum for her in Shaoxing, Qiu Jin's Former Residence (紹興秋瑾故居).

Chinese scholar Hu Ying, professor of East Asian Languages and Literature at the University of California, Irvine, published a monograph on Qiu in 2016, Burying Autumn, that explores Qiu Jin's friendship with her sworn sisters Wu Zhiying and Xu Zihua and situates her work in the larger sociopolitical and literary context of the time. 

Her life has been portrayed in plays, popular movies (including the 1972 Hong Kong film Chow Ken (《秋瑾》), and the documentary Autumn Gem, written by Rae Chang and directed by Chang and Adam Tow. One film, simply titled Qiu Jin, was released in 1983 and directed by Xie Jin. Another film, released in 2011, Jing Xiong Nüxia Qiu Jin (競雄女俠秋瑾), or The Woman Knight of Mirror Lake, was directed by Herman Yau. She is briefly shown in the beginning of 1911, being led to the execution ground to be beheaded. The movie was directed by Jackie Chan and Zhang Li. Immediately after her death Chinese playwrights used the incident, "resulting in at least eight plays before the end of the Ch'ing dynasty."

In 2018, The New York Times published a belated obituary for her.

Literary works 
Because Qiu is mainly remembered in the West as revolutionary and feminist, her poetry and essays are often overlooked (though owing to her early death, they are few). Her writing reflects an exceptional education in classical literature, and she writes traditional poetry (shi and ci). Qiu composes verse with a wide range of metaphors and allusions that mix classical mythology with revolutionary rhetoric.

For example, in a poem, A Reply Verse in Matching Rhyme (for Ishii-kun, a Japanese friend),  she wrote the following:

Editors Sun Chang and Saussy explain the metaphors as follows:
 line 4: "Your islands" translates "sandao," literally "three islands," referring to Honshu, Shikoku and Kyushu, while omitting Hokkaido - an old fashion way of referring to Japan.

 line 6: ... the conditions of the bronze camels, symbolic guardians placed before the imperial palace, is traditionally considered to reflect the state of health of the ruling dynasty. But in Qiu's poetry, it reflects instead the state of health of China.

On leaving Beijing for Japan, she wrote a poem, Reflections (written during travels in Japan) summarizing her life until that point:

War flames in the north‒when will it all end?

I hear the fighting at sea continues unabated.

Like the women of Qishi, I worry about my country in vain;

It's hard to trade kerchief and dress for a helmet

Gallery

See also 

 Feminism in China

References

Further reading

External links 
 The Qiu Jin Museum (archived) from chinaspirit.net.cn
 Autumn Gem, documentary film
 Five poems by Qiu Jin, contemporary translations by Yilin Wang
 Translation: Poems by Chinese feminist and revolutionary writer Qiu Jin, contemporary translations by Yilin Wang, with presentation
 Feminist, Revolutionary, Poet: A selection of poems by Qiu Jin, in new translation by Yilin Wang, biographical note and contemporary translations by Yilin Wang

1875 births
1907 deaths
20th-century executions by China
Chinese feminists
Chinese revolutionaries
Chinese women poets
People executed by the Qing dynasty by decapitation
Executed people from Fujian
People from Xiamen
People from Shaoxing
People of the 1911 Revolution
Executed Qing dynasty people
Qing dynasty poets
Tongmenghui members
Poets from Fujian
19th-century Chinese women writers
Chinese expatriates in Japan
Women in war in China
Burials in Hangzhou